Losha may refer to:

 Losha, a 2012 album by Andrea
 LoSHA (List of Sexual Harassers in Academia), compiled in 2017 by Dalit law student, Raya Sarkar
 Losha, a medieval Albanian clan whose most prominent member was Peter Losha